The Dutch Tweede Divisie in the 1966–67 season was contested by 23 teams. From this season onwards the league had been made into one. HFC Haarlem won the championship. Three teams would be promoted to the Eerste Divisie.

New entrant
Relegated from the Eerste Divisie:
 VVV-Venlo

League standings

Promotion play-off
Due to the 3rd-, 4th- and 5th-place finishers obtaining an equal number of points, a promotion play-off needed to be held.

See also
 1966–67 Eredivisie
 1966–67 Eerste Divisie

References
Netherlands - List of final tables (RSSSF)

Tweede Divisie seasons
3
Neth